The Euro-Latin American Parliamentary Assembly (EuroLat) is a trans-national body of 150 Parliamentarians from Europe and Latin America. It was established in 2006 to bolster EU-Latin American relations. It was described by Benita Ferrero-Waldner, the European Union's External Relations Commissioner, as "one of the key bodies in ensuring fruitful cooperation between our two regions."

Organisation
EuroLat is led by a Co-Presidency, the current European Co-President is Ramón Jáuregui Atondo and the Latin American Co-President is José Leonel Vasquéz Búcaro (of El Salvador, Parlacen). There are 14 Co-Vice Presidents, again equally split. The Co-Presidents and the Co-Vice Presidents form the Executive Bureau, the managing body. EuroLat has four standing committees: Political, Security and Human Rights Affairs; Economic, Financial and Trade Affairs; Committee on Social Affairs, Youth and Children, Human Exchanges, Education and Culture and Committee on Sustainable Development, Environment, Energy Policy, Research, Innovation and Technology. There can be a maximum of 2 temporary committees or working groups.

Members
The 150 members are split equally between European and Latin American members, currently drawn from the following bodies;
 European Parliament
 Andean Parliament
 Central American Parliament
 Latin American Parliament
 Parliament of Mercosur
 Congress of Mexico
 National Congress of Chile

Executive Bureau Members from European Parliament;
 Chair: Javi López (S&D, Spain)
 1st Vice Chair: Jordi Cañas Pérez (RE, Spain)
 2nd Vice Chair: Sandra Pereira (GUE/NGL, Portugal)
 3rd Vice Chair: Hermann Tertsch (ECR, Spain)
 4th Vice Chair: José Manuel García-Margallo (EPP, Spain)
 5th Vice Chair: Nikos Androulakis (S&D, Greece)
 6th Vice Chair: Herbert Dorfmann (EPP, Italy)
 7th Vice Chair: Beata Mazurek (ECR, Poland)

Executive Bureau Members from Latin America;
 José Manuel Vásquez Búcaro (Parlacen, El Salvador)
 Elías Ariel Castillo Gonzalez  (Parlatino, Panamá)
 Jorge Pizarro Soto (JPC Eu-Chile)
 Rabindranath Salazar Solorio (JPC EU-Mexico)
 María de los Angeles Higonet (Parlatino, Argentina)
 Doreen Javier Ibarra (Parlasur, Uruguay)
 José Pedro de la Cruz (Parlandino, Ecuador)
 Diego Aquino Acosta Rojas (Parlacen, Dominican Republic)

See also
 Euronest Parliamentary Assembly
 ACP–EU Joint Parliamentary Assembly

References

External links
 Euro-Latin American Parliamentary Assembly

Parliamentary assemblies
Latin